Kenneth Aninkora (born 4 October 1998) is a Dutch footballer who plays as a forward for DVS '33.

Career
Born in Amsterdam, Aninkora started his career as a youth player at SV Diemen, before joining the academy of AFC Ajax in 2007 and the academy of Amsterdamsche FC in 2014.
After making his debut for Amsterdamsche FC in 2017, he joined Almere City in the summer of 2017. After playing in the Derde Divisie and the Tweede Divisie with Jong Almere City, he made his debut for Almere City in March 2019. In May 2019, Aninkora signed his first professional contract with the club. His contract was terminated in January 2021.

In August 2021, he joined DVS '33 on a one-year deal.

References

External links
 
 

1998 births
Living people
Dutch footballers
Association football forwards
Footballers from Amsterdam
AFC Ajax players
Amsterdamsche FC players
Almere City FC players
DVS '33 players
Eerste Divisie players
Tweede Divisie players
Derde Divisie players
Dutch sportspeople of Ghanaian descent